Enrique Alejandro Esqueda Tirado (born 19 April 1988) is a Mexican former professional footballer who last played for East Bengal F.C. in the I-League. He represented Mexico at the 2015 Copa América. He is popularly known by his nickname "Paleta".

Club career

América
At club level, he made his debut for América on 4 February 2006 against Atlas. His debut in an international tournament came in 2007, when América participated in the Copa Sudamericana, where they finished runner-up. In 2009, América participated in the World Football Challenge, where he scored in the 2–1 win against AC Milan. In 2011, Esqueda scored against European powerhouses Manchester City in a 1–1 draw and against Real Madrid in a 2–3 loss.

Pachuca, Atlas, Tigres UANL, Veracruz and Chiapas
On 23 May 2011, he was transferred to C.F. Pachuca. After several years of injuries and ups and downs with Pachuca, he was loaned to Atlas in 2014. Under the command of Tomás Boy, Esqueda scored three goals with Atlas in the season. On 2015, he was loaned again to Tigres UANL. With Tigres, he scored a hat-trick in the Copa Libertadores 2015 victory of 5–4 over Juan Aurich on 15 April 2015. He also scored the last goal of the 3–0 victory in the Clásico Regiomontano against arch-rivals C.F. Monterrey on 18 April, as well as Tigres' first goal in the 2–1 victory over Bolivian side Club Universitario in the round of 16 of the 2015 Copa Libertadores.

After winning his first Liga MX with Tigres UANL as a reserve player, Esqueda was loaned out to Veracruz where he had a discreet stint. In July 2016, Esqueda was loaned out to second division team FC Juárez a move which Esqueda refused to comply with. After an inactive fall 2016 semester, Esqueda was loaned out to Chiapas F.C. His resentment for Tigres UANL is apparent as he has publicly desecrated the Tigres UANL crest on television.

After the disaffiliation of Chiapas F.C., Esqueda became a free agent.

Arka Gdynia
On 20 January 2018, Esqueda began trials with Ekstraklasa club Arka Gdynia. On 22 January, he made his unofficial debut with the Polish side in a friendly against Romanian Side Fc Botosani, and scored the 1st goal in an eventual 2–0 win, making Esqueda the 1st Mexican to score for any team in Poland. On 6 February, he signed a contract valid for the rest of 2017-18 season, with an extension option.

East Bengal
On 20 August 2018, free agent Esqueda joined Indian I-League club East Bengal for the upcoming season. On 27 October, he made his debut, scoring a brace in a 2–0 victory over NEROCA. He went onto score 9 goals in 14 matches as East Bengal finished 2nd in the I-League, with 3 assists and has been M.O.M. 3 times. He finished as the highest goal getter for East Bengal along with teammate Joby Justin in the 2018–19 I-League season. On 10 March 2019, Enrique was released from East Bengal contract.

International career
Esqueda was a part of the U-17 world champion team in Peru in 2005. He was also part of the U-20 team that represented Mexico at the 2007 FIFA U-20 World Cup, but was cut from the team at the last minute. He formed part of the U-23 team that was to represent Mexico at the 2007 Pan American Games in Rio de Janeiro, Brazil. He helped Mexico achieve a bronze medal, with him scoring four goals, becoming one of the top scorers of the tournament.

He was called up by the Mexico national team for a game against El Salvador. He scored his first goal on 14 October 2009 against Trinidad & Tobago in a 2–2 draw.

His most recent appearance was on 3 June 2015 in a friendly against Peru. He was part of the 2015 Copa America roster, however he did not make any appearances during the tournament.

International goals

|- 
| 1. || 14 October 2009 || Hasley Crawford Stadium, Port of Spain, Trinidad and Tobago ||  || 1–1 || 2–2 || 2010 FIFA World Cup qualifiers
|}

International appearances
As of 12 October 2010

Honours
América
InterLiga: 2008

East Bengal
I-League: Runner-up 2018–19

Tigres UANL
Liga MX: Apertura 2015

Mexico U-17
FIFA U-17 World Championship: 2005
Pan American Games: Bronze medal 2007

References

External links
Pasionaguila Blog y Noticias al minutos del Club America
Enrique Esqueda's stats

Esqueda profile at America's official site  

1988 births
Living people
Footballers from Querétaro
Sportspeople from Querétaro City
Association football wingers
Mexican footballers
Mexico international footballers
Footballers at the 2007 Pan American Games
2015 Copa América players
Pan American Games bronze medalists for Mexico
Pan American Games medalists in football
Liga MX players
Club América footballers
C.F. Pachuca players
Atlas F.C. footballers
Tigres UANL footballers
C.D. Veracruz footballers
Chiapas F.C. footballers
Ekstraklasa players
Arka Gdynia players
I-League players
East Bengal Club players
Mexican expatriate footballers
Expatriate footballers in Poland
Expatriate footballers in India
Mexican expatriate sportspeople in India
Medalists at the 2007 Pan American Games